Oroszlányi Szabadidő Egyesület is a professional football club based in Oroszlány, Komárom-Esztergom County, Hungary, that competes in the Komárom-Esztergom county league.

Name changes
1995–1996: Oroszlányi Torna FC
1996–2000: Oroszlányi Bányász SC
2000–2001: Oroszlányi Szabadidő Egyesület
2001–2004: Oroszlány-VÉRT
2004–present: Oroszlányi Szabadidő Egyesület

External links
 Profile on Magyar Futball

References

Football clubs in Hungary
Association football clubs established in 1995
1995 establishments in Hungary
Mining association football clubs in Hungary